Guising, guizing, a guiser or guizer may refer to:
 Guising, a Scottish and Irish tradition which is the origin of trick-or-treating
 Guiser, an amateur actor in a mummers' play
 Guizer, member of an Up Helly Aa squad
 Guise dancing, Christmastide community mumming performed in Cornwall

See also 
 Guise (disambiguation)
 Disguise
 Disguise (disambiguation) 
 Trick or treat (disambiguation)